Goshawk may refer to several species of birds of prey, mainly in the genus Accipiter:
 Northern goshawk, Accipiter gentilis, often referred to simply as the goshawk, since it is the only goshawk found in much of its range (in Europe and North America)
 Crested goshawk, Accipiter trivirgatus
 Sulawesi goshawk, Accipiter griseiceps
 Red-chested goshawk, Accipiter toussenelii
 African goshawk, Accipiter tachiro
 Imitator goshawk, Accipiter imitator
 Grey goshawk, Accipiter novaehollandiae
 Brown goshawk, Accipiter fasciatus
 Christmas goshawk, Accipiter (fasciatus) natalis
 Black-mantled goshawk, Accipiter melanochlamys
 Slaty-mantled goshawk Accipiter luteoschistaceus 
 Pied goshawk, Accipiter albogularis
 Fiji goshawk, Accipiter rufitorques
 White-bellied goshawk, Accipiter haplochrous
 Moluccan goshawk, Accipiter henicogrammus
 Grey-headed goshawk, Accipiter poliocephalus
 New Britain goshawk, Accipiter princeps
 Henst's goshawk, Accipiter henstii
 Meyer's goshawk, Accipiter meyerianus
 Shikra, Accipiter badius
 †Powerful goshawk, Accipiter efficax
 †Gracile goshawk, Accipiter quartus

but also the following:
 Gabar goshawk, Micronisus gabar
 Dark chanting goshawk, Melierax metabates
 Eastern chanting goshawk, Melierax poliopterus
 Pale chanting goshawk, Melierax canorus
 Red goshawk, Erythrotriorchis radiatus
 Chestnut-shouldered goshawk, Erythrotriorchis buergersi
 Doria's goshawk, Megatriorchis doriae

Accipitridae
Birds of prey